The Lifan X60 is a Chinese four-door compact crossover SUV produced by the Lifan Motors, division of Lifan Group.

Overview
The Lifan X60 was initially unveiled as a preview at the 2010 Shanghai Auto Show as the Lifan CUV concept, and the production version was formally launched at the 2011 Beijing Auto Show as the X60.

China Offroad Championship
After the motor sport events participated by the Lifan 320, Lifan has been preparing for the X60 to participate in the China Offroad Championship from April 2013.

Powertrain

Overseas markets
The Lifan X60 was also assembled in Iran and had many problems. One of the major drawbacks of the car gearbox is a steep first-gear ratio, causing vibration on initial acceleration. The drivetrain of the Lifan X60 was originally designed for the Lifan 620, and the engine was later shared with the heavy body of the X60, and as a result, it performed poorly. The clutch of the X60 heats up and burns when driving uphill due to the tall first-gear ratio of the gearbox.

References

External links

Lifan Motors website

X60
Cars introduced in 2011
2010s cars
Compact sport utility vehicles
Crossover sport utility vehicles
Cars of China